Leonard King Capewell (8 June 1895 – September 1978) was an English professional footballer whose played as a forward.

Capewell served with the Royal Engineers in Belgium during World War I.

Capewell is best known for his time with Aston Villa. While at Villa, Capewell played 156 games scoring 100 goals. Before playing for Villa he played for Wellington Town and also had spells with Bordesley Green, Washwood Heath Council Schools, Saltley Baptists and Wolseley Athletic Works FC.

Capewell left Villa for Walsall in February 1930.

References
Capewell's AVFC Bio

1895 births
1978 deaths
Aston Villa F.C. players
English footballers
Association football forwards
FA Cup Final players
British Army personnel of World War I
Royal Engineers soldiers